The Stayton Mail was a weekly newspaper serving Stayton in the U.S. state of Oregon, founded in the mid-1890s. It was published by the Statesman Journal; both papers, along with the nearby Silverton Appeal Tribune, are owned by the national Gannett Company.

History 
E. F. Bennett, who had previously tried to buy the Stayton Times (now defunct), started the Mail in 1896. Bennett sold it to H. E. Browne, who later founded the Silverton Tribune, in 1900. Editor Fred G. Conley made a substantial investment in a Mergenthaler typesetting machine in 1908, and changed the publication schedule from weekly to semi-weekly in January 1909. The paper continued to change hands among people associated with various local papers, including the Salem Statesman, a number of times through the late 1930s.

Gannet discontinued the Mail as of Sept. 14, 2022.

References

External links 
 Official website
 Historic Oregon Newspapers page

Newspapers published in Oregon
Marion County, Oregon
1894 establishments in Oregon
Stayton, Oregon
Publications established in 1894
Publications disestablished in 2022
2022 disestablishments in Oregon
Defunct newspapers published in Oregon